Matthias Kalle Dalheimer (born May 27, 1970) is a published author and software consultant from Sweden. He ported the StarOffice office suite to Linux and he was one of KDE’s first contributors. In August 2002 he was elected as president of KDE e.V.

Career 
Dalheimer founded Klarälvdalens Datakonsult AB, the first technical solution provider of Qt Development Frameworks, where he is the current President & CEO and Head of Development.

Books 
Matthias Kalle Dalheimer has written several books on the subject of Qt and Linux

"Running Linux, A Distribution-Neutral Guide for Servers and Desktops", by Matthias Kalle Dalheimer and Matt Welsh
Publisher: O'Reilly Media
Print 
Review,Free Software Magazine Mar 2, 2006
"Programming with Qt, Writing Portable GUI applications on Unix and Win32", by Matthias Kalle Dalheimer
Publisher: O'Reilly Media
Print

References

External links
 http://www.wizards-of-os.org/archiv/sprecher/d_f/kalle_dalheimer.html
 Kalle Dalheimer's website

KDE
Living people
1970 births